In mathematics, particularly differential geometry, a Finsler manifold is a differentiable manifold  where a (possibly asymmetric) Minkowski functional  is provided on each tangent space , that enables one to define the length of any smooth curve  as

Finsler manifolds are more general than Riemannian manifolds since the tangent norms need not be induced by inner products.

Every Finsler manifold becomes an intrinsic quasimetric space when the distance between two points is defined as the infimum length of the curves that join them.

 named Finsler manifolds after Paul Finsler, who studied this geometry in his dissertation .

Definition

  for all  (but not necessarily for  (positive homogeneity).
  unless  (positive definiteness).

In other words,  is an asymmetric norm on each tangent space . The Finsler metric  is also required to be smooth, more precisely:

The subadditivity axiom may then be replaced by the following strong convexity condition:

Strong convexity of  implies the subadditivity with a strict inequality if . If  is strongly convex, then it is a Minkowski norm on each tangent space.

A Finsler metric is reversible if, in addition,

  for all tangent vectors v.

A reversible Finsler metric defines a norm (in the usual sense) on each tangent space.

Examples
 Smooth submanifolds (including open subsets) of a normed vector space of finite dimension are Finsler manifolds if the norm of the vector space is smooth outside the origin.
 Riemannian manifolds (but not pseudo-Riemannian manifolds) are special cases of Finsler manifolds.

Randers manifolds
Let  be a Riemannian manifold and b a differential one-form on M with

Then

Smooth quasimetric spaces
Let (M, d) be a quasimetric so that M is also a differentiable manifold and d is compatible with the differential structure of M in the following sense:
 Around any point z on M there exists a smooth chart (U, φ) of M and a constant C ≥ 1 such that for every x, y ∈ U
 
 The function d: M × M → [0, ∞] is smooth in some punctured neighborhood of the diagonal.

Then one can define a Finsler function F: TM →[0, ∞] by

where γ is any curve in M with γ(0) = x and γ(0) = v. The Finsler function F obtained in this way restricts to an asymmetric (typically non-Minkowski) norm on each tangent space of M. The induced intrinsic metric  of the original quasimetric can be recovered from

and in fact any Finsler function F: TM → [0, ∞) defines an intrinsic quasimetric dL on M by this formula.

Geodesics
Due to the homogeneity of F the length

of a differentiable curve γ: [a, b] → M in M is invariant under positively oriented reparametrizations. A constant speed curve γ is a geodesic of a Finsler manifold if its short enough segments γ|[c,d] are length-minimizing in M from γ(c) to γ(d). Equivalently, γ is a geodesic if it is stationary for the energy functional

Canonical spray structure on a Finsler manifold
The Euler–Lagrange equation for the energy functional E[γ] reads in the local coordinates (x1, ..., xn, v1, ..., vn) of TM as

where k = 1, ..., n and gij is the coordinate representation of the fundamental tensor, defined as

Assuming the strong convexity of F2(x, v) with respect to v ∈ TxM, the matrix gij(x, v) is invertible and its inverse is denoted by gij(x, v). Then  is a geodesic of (M, F) if and only if its tangent curve {{nobreak|γ''': [a, b] → TM&setminus;{0} }} is an integral curve of the smooth vector field H on TM&setminus;{0} locally defined by

where the local spray coefficients Gi are given by

The vector field H on TM&setminus;{0} satisfies JH = V and [V, H] = H, where J and V are the canonical endomorphism and the canonical vector field on TM&setminus;{0}. Hence, by definition, H is a spray on M. The spray H defines a nonlinear connection on the fibre bundle  through the vertical projection

In analogy with the Riemannian case, there is a version

of the Jacobi equation for a general spray structure (M, H) in terms of the Ehresmann curvature and nonlinear covariant derivative.

Uniqueness and minimizing properties of geodesics
By Hopf–Rinow theorem there always exist length minimizing curves (at least in small enough neighborhoods) on (M, F). Length minimizing curves can always be positively reparametrized to be geodesics, and any geodesic must satisfy the Euler–Lagrange equation for E[γ]. Assuming the strong convexity of F2 there exists a unique maximal geodesic γ with γ(0) = x and γ(0) = v for any (x, v) ∈ TM&setminus;{0} by the uniqueness of integral curves.

If F2 is strongly convex, geodesics γ: [0, b] → M are length-minimizing among nearby curves until the first point γ(s) conjugate to γ(0) along γ, and for t > s there always exist shorter curves from γ(0) to γ(t) near γ'', as in the Riemannian case.

Notes

References

 

 
 (Reprinted by Birkhäuser (1951))

External links
 
 The (New) Finsler Newsletter

Differential geometry
Finsler geometry
Riemannian geometry
Riemannian manifolds
Smooth manifolds